Kitrino Galazio is the title of the second studio album by Greek singer Anna Vissi, released in Greece and Cyprus in 1979 by EMI Greece. It was her first album after her departure from Minos, her previous record label. The album reached platinum status, and was one of the best-selling albums of 1979 in Greece.

Background and release
After Vissi left record label Minos, she continued to pursue pop music with her second album. Music and lyrics for the album were written by Takis Bougas, I. Kalamitsi, Daniel Deschênes, G. Kanellopoulou, S. Blassopoulou, G. Kanellopoulou, Sakari, Psylla, and Vissi herself. The album was well received by the public, with first single "Aftos Pou Perimeno" becoming one of the most played songs of the year. Years later in 1987, Kitrino Galazio was among the first sets of albums that Minos EMI released on CD; the CD edition of the album was regularly shipped to shops throughout the years. In 1997, the popularity of the single "Aftos Pou Perimeno" continued, with two remixes each of it and "Oso Eho Foni" released on a maxi single titled The Remixes: Oso Eho Foni & Aftos Pou Perimeno. The original album was then re-released in 2006 in a remastered format that included the two remixes of "Aftos Pou Perimeno".

In 2007, the songs of the album were included on EMI's box set of Vissi's recordings titled Back to Time (Complete EMI Years) which, despite of being a box set, charted in the top 10 of the Greek albums chart.

Track listing

Original version
 "Kitrino Galazio Kai Meneksedi" (Yellow, blue and lilac)
 "Tote Tha Fygo" (Then I'll leave)
 "Ti Ta Theleis" (So what do you want?)
 "Kai Si Milas" (You talk)
 "Mi Stenoxoriese Kai Exei O Theos" (Don't worry, God has mercy)
 "Bres Ton Tropo" (Find a way)
 "Aftos Pou Perimeno" (The one I'm waiting for)
 "Magapas" (You love me)
 "Dyskolos Kairos" (Difficult times)
 "Agapi Mou" (My love)
 "An Toulachiston" (If at least)
 "To Etos Tou Paidiou" (The year of the child)

Remastered edition
 "Kitrino Galazio Kai Meneksedi"
 "Tote Tha Fygo"
 "Ti Ta Theleis"
 "Kai Si Milas"
 "Mi Stenoxoriese Kai Exei O Theos"
 "Bres Ton Tropo"
 "Aftos Pou Perimeno"
 "Magapas"
 "Dyskolos Kairos"
 "Agapi Mou"
 "Toulachiston"
 "To Etos Tou Paidiou"
 "Aftos Pou Perimeno" (Dream In The House Mix)
 "Aftos Pou Perimeno" (Anna's Dream Mix)

Credits and personnel

Personnel
Daniel Deschênes - music 
Dimitris Iatropoulos - lyrics 
Ioannis Kalamitsis - lyrics 
Giorgos Kanellopoulos - lyrics
Takis Bougas - music
Anna Vissi - vocals, music 
Marianna Sakari - music, lyrics

Production
Kostas Fasolas - production management, recording engineering at Studio ERA
Giorgos Niarchos - arrangements, instrumentation, orchestral conduction
Charalambos Biris - assistant recording engineer at Studio ERA

Design
Christos Christodoulidis - photos
Dimitris Arvanitis - cover design

Credits adapted from the album's liner notes.

References

Anna Vissi albums
1979 albums
Greek-language albums
Minos EMI albums